Tyrannochromis is a small genus of haplochromine cichlids endemic to Lake Malawi.

Species
There are currently four recognized species in this genus:
 Tyrannochromis macrostoma (Regan, 1922)
 Tyrannochromis maculiceps (C. G. E. Ahl, 1926)
 Tyrannochromis nigriventer Eccles, 1989
 Tyrannochromis polyodon (Trewavas, 1935)

References

 
Haplochromini

Cichlid genera
Taxa named by Ethelwynn Trewavas
Taxonomy articles created by Polbot